Nina Auerbach (May 24, 1943 in New York City – February 4, 2017) was the John Welsh Centennial Professor of English Emerita at the University of Pennsylvania. Her special area of concentration was nineteenth-century England. She published, lectured, and reviewed widely in the fields of Victorian literature, theater, cultural history, and horror fiction and film.

Auerbach received a B.A. from the University of Wisconsin-Madison in 1964. She undertook graduate study at Columbia University, receiving an M.A. in 1967 and a Ph.D. in 1970. She taught at Hunter College and California State University, Los Angeles before joining the University of Pennsylvania faculty in 1972. She remained on the faculty there until her retirement in 2009.

Her books include Our Vampires, Ourselves; Private Theatricals: The Lives of the Victorians; Ellen Terry, Player in Her Time; Romantic Imprisonment: Women and Other Glorified Outcasts; Woman and the Demon: The Life of a Victorian Myth; and Communities of Women: An Idea in Fiction (Harvard University Press). Her most recent book, Daphne du Maurier, Haunted Heiress (2000), inaugurated the University of Pennsylvania Press series, Personal Takes. Before her death, she was working on a project tentatively titled Lost Lives, a study of ghosts and their purposes. She was the co-editor of the Norton Critical Edition of Bram Stoker's Dracula, and many of her articles have appeared in Norton Critical Editions, most notably in the works of Jane Austen.

Nina Auerbach was awarded a Guggenheim Fellowship and a Ford Foundation Fellowship as well as the Lindback Award for Distinguished Teaching. In 2000, she received the annual Distinguished Scholarship Award from the International Association of the Fantastic in the Arts.

References

External links

University of Pennsylvania Faculty Profile

1943 births
2017 deaths
Literary critics of English
University of Pennsylvania faculty
University of Wisconsin–Madison alumni
Columbia University alumni
American academics of English literature